Wheatmore High School is a high school in Trinity, North Carolina. Wheatmore was originally built to help with an overflow of students from Trinity High School. Wheatmore High opened for the 2009–2010 school year.

Notable alumni
 Thad Moffitt, stock car racing driver

References

2008 establishments in North Carolina
Educational institutions established in 2008
Public high schools in North Carolina
Schools in Randolph County, North Carolina